Leonardo Soledispa (born 15 January 1983) is an Ecuadorian footballer. He played in six matches for the Ecuador national football team from 2004 to 2006. He was also part of Ecuador's squad for the 2004 Copa América tournament.

Career
Soledispa started his career with Barcelona S.C.

References

External links
 

1983 births
Living people
Ecuadorian footballers
Ecuador international footballers
Association football midfielders
Sportspeople from Guayaquil